Louis Franck or Frank may refer to:

 Louis Franck (politician), Belgian politician
 Louis Franck (ice hockey), Belgian ice hockey player
 Louis Franck, frontman of Ukrainian band Esthetic Education
 Louis Frank (lawyer), Belgian intellectual and activist for women's rights